Brett William Eibner (born December 2, 1988) is an American professional baseball pitcher and outfielder who is a free agent. He has played in Major League Baseball (MLB) for the Kansas City Royals, Oakland Athletics, Los Angeles Dodgers and Miami Marlins.

Amateur career
Eibner attended The Woodlands High School in The Woodlands, Texas, and helped them win the 2006 5A state championship as a junior, with teammate Kyle Drabek. As a senior, Eibner was named 15-5A first-team all-district outfielder. Despite being drafted by the Houston Astros in the fourth round of the 2007 MLB draft, Eibner did not sign and attended the University of Arkansas.

As a freshman, Eibner led the team in RBI and had three game-winning hits. For his efforts, Eibner was named to Baseball America's Freshman All-American team in 2008. The following season, Eibner was named SEC Pitcher of the Week for his complete-game one-hit shutout win against the #1 Georgia Bulldogs. Eibner struggled significantly at the plate, with his average dropping to .231 and striking out 60 times. However, when the 2009 Arkansas Razorbacks baseball team reached the College World Series, Eibner hit "one of the most memorable home runs in program history" when he tied an elimination game vs Virginia in the top of the ninth with a two-run home run. Eibner returned for his junior season with the Razorbacks, hitting .333 with 22 home runs. On the mound, Eibner went 3–5 in 58 innings for the Razorbacks in the regular season. In the 2010 Tempe, Arizona Super Regional, Eibner hit a game-tying home run with the Razorbacks down to their final strike, extending the game to extra innings where the Razorbacks lost in the 12th. Following the 2010 season, Eibner became the fourth Razorback to be named both a freshman All-American and All-American, including teammate Zack Cox. He was also a John Olerud Award Semifinalist, Second Team All-SEC, and ABCA/Rawlings First Team All-South Region player.

In 2008 and 2009, he played collegiate summer baseball with the Wareham Gatemen of the Cape Cod Baseball League.

Professional career

Kansas City Royals
The Kansas City Royals selected Eibner in the second round of the 2010 MLB draft.

In 2013, Eibner played for the Northwest Arkansas Naturals of the Class AA Texas League.

After the 2015 season, Royals added him to their 40-man roster

On May 26, 2016, Royals promoted Eibner to the MLB. He made his MLB debut the following night at Kansas City's Kauffman Stadium, going 1-for-3 and scoring a run while striking out twice in the Royals' 7–5 win over the Chicago White Sox. Facing off against the White Sox on May 28, 2016, the Royals were trailing 7–1 in the 9th inning, but Eibner completed the rally with a walk-off single to win it for the Royals 8–7.

Oakland Athletics

On July 30, 2016, the Royals traded Eibner to the Oakland Athletics for Billy Burns. Eibner was designated for assignment by the Athletics on January 20, 2017.

Los Angeles Dodgers
On January 25, 2017, Eibner was traded to the Los Angeles Dodgers, in exchange for Jordan Tarsovich and assigned to the Triple-A Oklahoma City Dodgers to begin the season. The Dodgers called him up to MLB on April 19. After playing in 17 games for the Dodgers, he was returned to the minors where the Dodgers attempted to convert him to a pitcher. However, he injured his elbow and underwent Tommy John surgery, ending his season. On September 1, 2017, he was designated for assignment and released the following day.

Texas Rangers
On December 22, 2017, Eibner signed a minor league contract with the Texas Rangers. He was released on March 19, 2019.

Texas AirHogs
On June 7, 2019, Eibner signed with the Texas AirHogs of the independent American Association. In 36 games he slashed .167/.310/.319 with 3 home runs and 5 RBIs, he also pitched in 16 games throwing 18 innings with a 1.00 ERA and 27 strikeouts.

Sugar Land Skeeters
On August 30, 2019, Eibner was traded to the Sugar Land Skeeters of the Atlantic League of Professional Baseball. He became a free agent following the season. He pitched in 8 games throwing 8 innings with a 2.25 ERA and 8 strikeouts.

Eastern Reyes del Tigre
In July 2020, Eibner signed on to play for the Eastern Reyes del Tigre of the Constellation Energy League (a makeshift 4-team independent league created as a result of the COVID-19 pandemic) for the 2020 season. He pitched in 5 games throwing 5.1 innings with a 0.00 ERA and 8 strikeouts.

Miami Marlins
On August 2, 2020, the Miami Marlins purchased Eibner's contract. Eibner was selected to the major league roster on August 18 and made his MLB debut as a pitcher that night in the ninth inning against the New York Mets. On August 29, 2020, Eibner was designated for assignment by the Marlins. Eibner was re-selected to the active roster on September 21. Eibner was designated for assignment a second time on September 23. On April 10, 2021, Eibner re-signed with the Marlins on a minor league contract. He elected free agency on November 7, 2021.

References

External links

1988 births
Living people
Arkansas Razorbacks baseball players
Baseball players from Texas
Kane County Cougars players
Jacksonville Jumbo Shrimp players
Kansas City Royals players
Los Angeles Dodgers players
Major League Baseball outfielders
Major League Baseball pitchers
Miami Marlins players
Nashville Sounds players
Northwest Arkansas Naturals players
Oakland Athletics players
Oklahoma City Dodgers players
Omaha Storm Chasers players
People from The Woodlands, Texas
Sportspeople from Harris County, Texas
Sugar Land Skeeters players
Texas AirHogs players
United States national baseball team players
Wareham Gatemen players
Wilmington Blue Rocks players
Eastern Reyes del Tigre players